Christendom College is a Catholic liberal arts college in Front Royal, Virginia, United States, located in the Shenandoah Valley. It is endorsed by The Newman Guide to Choosing a Catholic College and has been characterized as a conservative Catholic liberal arts college. The school does not accept federal funding.

History

Founding 

Christendom College was founded by Warren H. Carroll in 1977 with $50,000. Carroll, who was a contributor at L. Brent Bozell Jr.'s Triumph magazine, decided to found Christendom in the aftermath of the Land O' Lakes conference in 1967. Desiring a return to a Catholic university education adhering to the teachings of the Catholic Magisterium, Carroll and four founding faculty members, William Marshner, Jeffrey A. Mirus, Kristin (née Popik) Burns, and Raymund P. O'Herron, started the college in an abandoned elementary school in Triangle, Virginia, housing a total of 26 students and five faculty.

Carroll decided not to accept federal funding at the college, choosing instead to rely on generous benefactors. Similar to the reasonings at Hillsdale College, Carroll believed that the government might eventually intrude on Christendom's academic and religious freedom.

In 1997, Warren Carroll acknowledged the debt Christendom College owed to L. Brent Bozell Jr. and Triumph magazine in his obituary for Bozell:

In 1979, the College acquired its new campus in Front Royal, Virginia, overlooking the Shenandoah River.  It still occupies this site today.

1980s 
 Carroll remained as president until 1985 when Dr. Damian Fedoryka was named as the second president. Carroll stepped back to focus on teaching history and writing, remaining on the faculty and serving as the chairman of the history department until his retirement in 2002.

During Fedoryka's seven-year tenure as president, Blessed Margaret and St. Joseph's Halls were constructed, and the college became fully accredited in 1987. The college also retired nearly $600,000 in debt without disrupting the growth of the college.

Fedoryka, through his contacts in the Vatican, brought the college into contact with then-Pope John Paul II, who later told Carroll that Christendom "was doing a great work for the Church." Fedoryka resigned in 1992, in order to pursue other educational ventures, including stints at Franciscan University of Steubenville and Ave Maria College in Michigan (later Ave Maria University FL.).

1990s—present
In 1992, Dr. Timothy O'Donnell, who had been a professor at Christendom since 1985, was named as the college's third president. During his tenure, the college increased the number of buildings on campus to over 20, including St. Lawrence Commons, St. Francis, St. Benedict, St. Catherine of Siena, and St. Clare Hall, St. Louis the Crusader Gymnasium, and St. John the Evangelist Library. O'Donnell's biggest building contribution was the new Chapel of Christ the King, which he promised in his inaugural address as president. Needing a major gift to launch the project, O'Donnell prayed with then-Executive Vice President Mark McShurley for help and, within 30 minutes of praying together, an anonymous donor called to pledge $250,000 to the Chapel fund. Construction began in 1992, and was completed in 1995. Domino's Pizza founder Tom Monaghan donated 19th Century wooden stations of the cross to the Chapel, and it was dedicated by Cardinal Jan Schotte, Pope John Paul II's Secretary-General to the World Synod of Bishops.

The college also acquired the Notre Dame Institute during O'Donnell's tenure. Started in 1969, the Notre Dame Institute was created to train religious sisters to teach Catholic doctrine to other teachers, but later welcomed lay students in the late 1970s. In 1983, the Institute was permitted by the Commonwealth of Virginia to grant degrees. In the 1990s, Reverend William Saunders became president of the Institute and moved it to its present location in Alexandria, Virginia, in addition to leading it to full accreditation by the Southern Association of Colleges and Schools. In 1997, the Institute was merged with Christendom College and became the Notre Dame Graduate School of Christendom College, now the Graduate School of Theology. In 2002, Fr. Saunders left his position as dean, and founding faculty member Dr. Kristin Burns took over the position. Under her tenure, the graduate school began offering M.A. in Theological Studies degrees online.

The college's Junior Semester in Rome program was established in 2002. Students live near the Vatican during the fall and spring, taking classes in St. Peter's Square and traveling across Europe during their time abroad.

Since 1992, student enrollment has grown from 144 undergraduates to nearly 550 students, not including graduate school students. The school has also broken enrollment goals and records numerous years in a row, defying declining higher education enrollment trends across the United States. 

The total financial assets have increased by 440%, and total plant costs have increased by 397%. As of the fall of 2022, the college has over 4,000 alumni, with 2,194 of them having earned degrees (A.A., B.A., or M.A.).

The college now employs more than 40 full-time faculty members, compared to the original five, along with a number of adjunct members. The faculty hold degrees from schools such as Columbia University, Yale University, Catholic University of America, University of Notre Dame, University of Virginia, the Pontifical University of Saint Thomas Aquinas, and The John Paul II Institute for Marriage and Family (Rome, Washington DC, and Melbourne sessions).

College Scorecard 
In 2015, Christendom was left off of President Barack Obama's College Scorecard, which was created to help high school graduates pick schools. Critics claimed that conservative schools, such as Hillsdale College, Grove City College, and Christendom were intentionally left off due to their conservative values.

A Call To Greatness Campaign
Starting in September 2016, Christendom College launched an ambitious project called the "A Call To Greatness Campaign" to raise $40 million for the college's endowment, the annual fund, and a construction project to build a new 750-seat medieval gothic chapel featuring a 130-foot tower and eight prayer altars. The cost of the chapel is estimated to run approximately $13.5 million, with an additional $13.5 million allocated to the endowment and the remaining $13 million going to the annual fund. Within a month of the fundraiser's launch, roughly 70%, or $28 million, had been raised for the campaign. The Chapel will officially be dedicated and opened to the public in the spring of 2023.

Endorsements

Christendom College has received notable attention from members of the Catholic Church since its founding in 1977, including from Pope John Paul II. When meeting with College President Dr. Timothy O'Donnell and founder Dr. Warren Carroll in 1991, John Paul II told Carroll that “Christendom College is doing a great work for the Church.”

Pope Benedict XVI also gave his endorsement to Christendom College, saying, “I am well aware of the distinguished record of Christendom College and of the outstanding contribution which it has made to Catholic life in the United States. For this reason, I am particularly honored to associate myself with such a fine Catholic institution of higher learning and my prayers are that Christendom College will enjoy many more years of service in the education and formation of young people.”

Christendom College is also listed as a Recommended College by the Newman Guide to Choosing a Catholic College. The Guide, which seeks to defend and promote Catholic higher education, calls Christendom "a national model of faithful liberal arts education and Catholic formation."

Over the years, the college has also received praise from political leaders in the United States. In 2018, while delivering the Commencement Address for Christendom, U.S. Supreme Court Justice Clarence Thomas said, “This is a wonderful, wonderful, college…  a decidedly Catholic college, and I am decidedly and unapologetically Catholic. It is this faith that has been the guiding beacon during some difficult and seemingly hopeless times, even when I had turned my heart against Him and turned my back on [faith]. I have no doubt that this faith will do the same for each of you if you let it, and perhaps even if you don’t. It is not a tether. Rather, it is a guide — the way, the truth, and the life.”

Student sexual assault and harassment allegations 
By refusing to accept most forms of federal funding, Christendom College is exempt from many federal guidelines concerning sex-based and other forms of discrimination (e.g., Title IX), investigations into accusations of sexual abuse, and the sharing of information about on-campus crimes.

On January 16, 2018, Catholic blogger Simcha Fisher broke the story of three rape and sexual harassment allegations by students of the college. College President Timothy O'Donnell acknowledged victims in an official statement, saying, "We have failed some of our students. I am grateful to each woman who has come forward with her story. We need to hear you and your experience. Disclosing abuse and its aftermath is painful and difficult, and it takes a tremendous amount of courage. To those students who have been harmed, I am deeply sorry. We will do better."  This statement has since been removed from the college website. The college has since updated the apology with a Sexual Misconduct FAQs page that outlines the steps the college takes when cases of sexual misconduct are brought to its attention. 

Since the story initially broke, additional allegations of at least 18 previous cases of sexual harassment and assault over the past 45 years have been made. As a result, a group of alumni called for the school to adopt Title IX policies to better protect students in the future and also called for the resignation of O'Donnell. A change.org petition in support of O'Donnell was signed by over 1,000 people.  The college hired Husch-Blackwell to audit campus compliance with best practices in sexual assault and harassment cases, although it is not bound to do so by Title IX as the College does not accept federal funding of Title IV. The college has not released the results of this audit to the public.

Additional allegations against staff 
Former professor and Professor Emeritus William Raymond Luckey was arrested on June 25, 2021 on charges of solicitation of a minor younger than 16 years old and two counts of taking indecent liberties with a child." He was released on $50,000 bail on July 12, 2021. In regards to the 2018 sexual assault and harassment allegations, Luckey was one of several staff members that a college administrator mentioned as having been "transitioned out." Luckey was a professor at Christendom College from 1984 until he retired in 2015, according to a statement on the college's website. He has had no interaction with the school since 2015, the college said in an interview with the Northern Virginia Daily, adding that Luckey’s relationship with the school would not continue.

In 2022, Luckey appeared in court and pled guilty in order to receive a reduced sentence of time served, 24 months supervised probation, and must register as a sex offender. Judge William W. Sharp accepted the agreement and Luckey’s guilty pleas. Luckey also has no prior criminal record, the judge added.

List of presidents

Academics 

Christendom College has two schools offering graduate and undergraduate degrees. Undergraduate students combine a liberal arts core-curriculum with eventual upper-level courses in their major field (or fields) of study. Graduates can choose from three theological concentrations: Systematic Theology, Moral Theology, and Catechetics

Undergraduate college
All graduates of the undergraduate college are awarded a bachelor of arts degree in one of the following fields of study:
 Classical and Early Christian Studies
 Economics (minor only)
 English Language and Literature
 History
 Philosophy
 Political Science and Economics
 Mathematics
 Music (minor only)
 Science (minor only)
 Theology

Christendom College Graduate School of Theology
The Christendom Graduate School offers masters-level courses with a comprehensive grasp of the Catholic faith, preparing students for advanced graduate studies and for various ministries in the Catholic Church, according to the school's website. Its flexible and accommodating studies allows students of all ages and from all over the world to attend either part-time or full-time, year-round, summers-only, or winters-only, and also to study at a distance through online courses.

Semester in Rome
The Semester in Rome includes a continuation of the College's core curriculum program for juniors (THEO 301 Moral Theology during the Fall; and THEO 302 Apologetics in the spring), as well as courses in Italian, Roman Art & Architecture, and the Language, Culture, and History of Rome. The semester also includes a week's pilgrimage to Assisi and Siena as well as a trip to Florence.

Campus

Residence halls

Men's dormitories:

 St. Augustine Hall
 St. Benedict Hall
 St. Francis Hall
 St. Joseph Hall
 St. Pius Hall
 St. Columba Hall

Women's dormitories:

 St. Clare Hall
 St. Catherine of Siena Hall
 St. Edmund Campion Hall
 St. Theresa Hall

Academic buildings
 Aula Magna Mariae (Chapel Crypt)
 St. Lawrence Commons
 St. John the Evangelist Library
 St. Thomas Aquinas Hall

Other buildings
 Christ the King Chapel
 King Louis the Crusader Gymnasium
 John Paul the Great Student Center
 Madonna Hall
 Regina Coeli Hall

Student life

Athletics

Christendom has several varsity sports, and has a variety of intramural sports throughout the year.

In 2017, Christendom's rugby team won the NSCRO 7's Collegiate Rugby National Championship in its first year of contention. The team defeated St. Mary's College of Maryland in overtime to capture the title, earning the school its first National Championship.

In 2021, the rugby team won the National Collegiate Rugby Cohen Cup National Championship in Houston, Texas, defeating New Mexico Tech. This was the school's first 15s rugby National Championship title.

In 2021 and 2022, the men's rugby team also received the #1 national ranking from National Collegiate Rugby.

See also
 WXDM
 WHFW

References

External links

 Christendom College official site

 
Educational institutions established in 1977
Universities and colleges accredited by the Southern Association of Colleges and Schools
Education in Warren County, Virginia
Non-profit organizations based in Front Royal, Virginia
USCAA member institutions
1977 establishments in Virginia
Catholic universities and colleges in Virginia
Roman Catholic Diocese of Arlington